Onat is a surname and a masculine given name of Turkish origin. Notable people with the name include:

Surname
Çiğdem Selışık Onat (born 1939), Turkish actress
Emin Halid Onat (1908–1961), Turkish academic and architect 
İlhan Onat (1929–2013), Turkish chess player and pharmacist

Given name
Onat Kazaklı (born 1993), Turkish rower 
Onat Kutlar (1936–1995), Turkish writer

Surnames of Turkish origin
Turkish masculine given names